Wallfisch is a surname. Notable people with the surname include: 

Anita Lasker-Wallfisch (born 1925), British cellist
Benjamin Wallfisch (born 1979), English composer, conductor, and pianist
Elizabeth Wallfisch (born 1952), Australian violinist
Ernst Wallfisch (1920-1979), American violist
Paul Wallfisch (born 1962), American musician
Peter Wallfisch (1924-1993), British concert pianist
Raphael Wallfisch (born 1953), English cellist
Simon Wallfisch (born 1982), British-German classical singer and cellist